The Hotel NH Capri La Habana is a historic high rise hotel located in central Havana, Cuba.

History

In 1955, President Batista enacted Hotel Law 2074, offering tax incentives, government loans, and casino licenses to anyone wishing to build hotels in excess of $1,000,000 or nightclubs for $200,000 in Havana. This law brought Meyer Lansky and his "associates" in the mafia flooding to the city to take advantage.

The Hotel Capri de Havana was one of the first mob hotels to be built. Located on Calle 21, 1 Mp. 8 Vedado, only two blocks from the Hotel Nacional, it opened in November 1957. With its 250 rooms, the nineteen-story structure was one of the largest hotel/casinos in Havana during its heyday. It boasted a swimming pool on the roof.

Owned by mobster Santo Trafficante, Jr. of Tampa, Florida, the hotel/casino was operated by Nicholas Di Costanzo, racketeer Charles Turin (aliases: Charles Tourine, Charley "The Blade"), and Santino Masselli of the Bronx NY(aliases:"Sonny the Butcher"). After it opened, George Raft was hired to be the public front for the hotel's club during his gangster days in Cuba. It was believed that he owned a considerable interest in the club.

The hotel was designed by architect Jose Canaves and owned by the Canaves family.  The hotel, along with its famous casino, was leased to American hotelier, "Skip" Shephard.  The Hotel Capri was nationalized by the Cuban government in October 1960, and the casino was closed.

The hotel was known as the Hotel Horizontes Capri in the 1990s, before it closed in 2003. It reopened  in January 2014, following major renovations managed by the Spanish NH Hotel Group as the Hotel NH Capri La Habana.

In 2017 the hotel was one of several sites of a suspected acoustic attack against American diplomats, described as "Havana syndrome". Reports of piercing, high-pitched noises and inexplicable ailments were investigated, but a source of the phenomenon was never definitively determined.

Filmography 
The rooftop pool can be seen in the opening scene of Mikhail Kalatozov's film "I Am Cuba". 
The main entrance and adjoining square are visible in the Soviet spy miniseries "TASS Is Authorized to Declare..." (episode 2, 55:05-55:43), based on a novel of the same name by Yulian Semyonov.
In Francis Ford Coppola's movie The Godfather Part II, Fredo Corleone brings a suitcase containing $2 million to his brother Michael at the "Hotel Capri". The movie refers to the involvement of the American mafia in the gambling and hotel industry in Cuba during the Batista dictatorship. The film was shot in the Dominican Republic, where the Hotel El Embajador doubled for the Capri.

Gallery

See also

FOCSA Building
Monument to the Victims of the USS Maine (Havana)
Malecón, Havana
Havana Plan Piloto
Timeline of Havana

Notes

References

External links
 Hotel NH Capri La Habana official website
 Mobsters Move in on Troubled Havana and Split Rich Gambling Profits with Batista Life magazine March 10, 1958 pp32-37

Hotel buildings completed in 1957
Hotels in Havana
Hotels established in 1957
20th-century architecture in Cuba